The Brooks Building is a high-rise building in Chicago's commercial core, the Loop. It was built 1909–1910, in the Chicago School architectural style. An early example steel-framed high-rise building, the structure was commissioned by Peter Brooks and Shepard Brooks and designed by architects Holabird & Roche. The building was designated a Chicago Landmark on January 14, 1997. It was also determined eligible for listing in the National Register of Historic Places (NRHP) on October 8, 1982; however, it is not formally included in the NRHP due to the wishes of the property's owner.

See also 
 Architecture of Chicago
 List of Chicago Landmarks

References

External links 
 
 

Skyscraper office buildings in Chicago
Office buildings completed in 1910
Chicago school architecture in Illinois
Projects by Holabird & Root
1910 establishments in Illinois